Romans 5 is the fifth chapter of the Epistle to the Romans in the New Testament of the Christian Bible. It is authored by Paul the Apostle, while he was in Corinth in the mid-50s AD, with the help of an amanuensis (secretary), Tertius, who adds his own greeting in Romans 16:22.

Text
The original text was written in Koine Greek. This chapter is divided into 21 verses.

Textual witnesses
Some early manuscripts containing the text of this chapter are:
Codex Vaticanus (AD 325–350)
Codex Sinaiticus (330–360)
Codex Alexandrinus (400–440)
Codex Ephraemi Rescriptus (~450; complete)
Papyrus 31 (7th century; extant verses 3–8)

Old Testament references
 Romans 5:1 references Habakkuk 2:4: "But the just shall live by his faith"

Peace with God through Jesus Christ (5:1–11)
Romans 5:1 opens a new section in Paul's letter. Scottish Free Church minister William Robertson Nicoll imagines "that a pause comes[...] in [Paul's dictation of] his work; that he is silent, and Tertius puts down the pen, and they spend their hearts awhile on worshipping, recollection and realisation. The Lord delivered up; His people justified; the Lord risen again, alive for evermore – here was matter for love, joy, and wonder".

Paul resumes with "a description of the serene and blissful state which the sense of justification brings":

The Textus Receptus reads  but some manuscripts read  and similarly the Vulgate reads . Theologian Heinrich Meyer argues that this variant "is here utterly unsuitable; because the writer now enters on a new and important doctrinal topic, and an exhortation at the very outset, especially regarding a subject not yet expressly spoken of, would at this stage be out of place". The New Living Translation speaks of "peace with God because of what Jesus Christ our Lord has done for us".

Verse 8

 Cross references: John 3:16; John 15:13; 1 Peter 3:18; 1 John 3:16; 1 John 4:10

Adam and Christ (5:12–21)
In chapter 4 the story of Abraham provides the prototype for the doctrine of justification by faith, and in the first part of chapter 5, the justification won by Christ's death is characterized as reconciliation with God. This section deals with the reason that Christ's work alone can save others, because originally it was the action of one individual that affected the standing of all other person, and that individual was Adam. Thus, Paul points out Adam as" precedent" (in form of "counterexample") for "the universality of Christ's atonement".

Verse 12

On the basis of Genesis 3, Paul argues that "sin came into the world through one man", who is Adam (not Eve), and the ubiquity of sin is proved by "the universality of its consequence, which is "death"" (cf. Genesis 3:3).

Verse 13

Verse 14

The law given through Moses actually increases human's culpability, as all humans could transgress the way Adam had transgressed, which is the "disobedience of an explicit commandment" (verses 13–14; cf. Romans 4:15).

Verse 18 
Therefore, as one trespass led to condemnation for all men, so one act of righteousness leads to justification and life for all men.

—Romans 5:18, English Standard VersionPaul contrasts the universal effect of Adam's sinful act and that of Christ's redemptive work. This text has been viewed by some as evidence for universal salvation due to the parallel use of 'all men' in reference to both "condemnation" and "justification". A similar point is made again by Paul in his first letter to the church at Corinth (cf. 1 Corinthians 15:21–22).

See also
 Last Adam
 Moses
 Related Bible parts: Habakkuk 2, John 3, John 15, 1 Peter 3, 1 John 3, 1 John 4

References

Bibliography

External links 
 King James Bible - Wikisource
English Translation with Parallel Latin Vulgate
Online Bible at GospelHall.org (ESV, KJV, Darby, American Standard Version, Bible in Basic English)
Multiple bible versions at Bible Gateway (NKJV, NIV, NRSV etc.)

05